Miriam Shor (born July 25, 1971) is an American actress. She is known for her performance in the rock musical Hedwig and the Angry Inch and in the 2001 film adaptation of the same name. She later starred in a number of short-lived television series, including Swingtown (2008) and GCB (2012). Shor starred in the TV Land comedy series Younger from 2015–2021. Shor played Madelaine True in the Encores! production of The Wild Party at the New York City Center July 15–18, 2015 alongside Younger co-star Sutton Foster.

Early life
Shor was born in Minneapolis, Minnesota. She has described herself as "half Jewish but not really religious" (her father was Jewish). She speaks fluent Italian. Her parents divorced when she was seven, and she moved back and forth between Turin, Italy (to live with her mother), and suburban Detroit (her father's residence). She later attended the University of Michigan, where she received her B.F.A. in drama.

Career
Shor moved to New York City and began appearing onstage, notably in Hedwig and the Angry Inch. In 2000 she starred in the short-lived ABC sitcom Then Came You. She accepted supporting roles in the Harold Ramis comedy remake Bedazzled (2000) and the 2001 cinematization of Hedwig and the Angry Inch, reprising her role of Yitzhak. During the 2001-2002 television season, she starred in the NBC short-lived comedy series Inside Schwartz, opposite Breckin Meyer and Maggie Lawson. Shor later starred in a few independent films and guest-starred on episodes of My Name Is Earl and The West Wing. In 2006, she made a cameo appearance in Shortbus, directed by her Hedwig and the Angry Inch co-star John Cameron Mitchell.

In 2006, Shor starred in the ABC television comedy series Big Day opposite Marla Sokoloff and Wendie Malick but the series was canceled after one season. In 2007, Shor lent a supporting role to Mary Stuart Masterson's directorial debut, the slice-of-life drama The Cake Eaters. The following year, she was cast in the 1970s-set primetime CBS drama series Swingtown as Janet Thompson. The show was canceled due to mixed reception and low ratings. Shor had a recurring role on FX legal drama Damages as 'Carrie Parsons' and appeared on Law & Order: Criminal Intent, Bored to Death, and Royal Pains. In 2011 she played the role of 'Anna' on the HBO's miniseries adaptation of Mildred Pierce.

She appeared in 2012 Broadway Bares with Kyle Dean Massey.
In 2012, Shor starred as 'Cricket Caruth-Reilly' in the ABC comedy-drama series GCB, along with Leslie Bibb, Kristin Chenoweth, Annie Potts, Jennifer Aspen and Marisol Nichols but the series was canceled after one season. Later in 2012 Shor was cast in a recurring role as dogged reporter Mandy Post in season four of The Good Wife. In 2014, Shor was cast as a series regular in the TV Land single-camera comedy pilot Younger, produced by Darren Star, and starring Sutton Foster. The network ordered the show on April 14, 2014, and season one premiered on March 31, 2015. On April 21, 2015, TV Land announced that Younger had been renewed for a second season of 12 episodes, same as the first season. The second season premiered on January 13, 2016. In 2018, she received Critics' Choice Television Award for Best Supporting Actress in a Comedy Series nomination for her performance. In 2018, she made her directing debut with an episode of Younger.

In 2015, Shor played Madelaine True alongside Foster in The Wild Party at the New York City Center from July 15–18. She had a recurring role as Erica Haskard in the final season of FX period drama series, The Americans. Along with cast, she received Screen Actors Guild Award nomination for Outstanding Performance by an Ensemble in a Drama Series. She later starred opposite Amy Ryan in the drama film Lost Girls, which premiered at the Sundance Film Festival on January 28, 2020. She also played a leading role, first in her career, in the comedy-drama film Magic Hour directed by Jacqueline Christy. In 2020, she was cast in the science fiction film Good Morning, Midnight directed by George Clooney and based on the novel of the same name by Lily Brooks-Dalton.

Personal life
Shor is married to Justin Hagan. They have two children, Ruby and Iris.

Filmography

Film

Television

Stage

Video games

Awards and nomination

References

External links
 
 

1971 births
20th-century American actresses
21st-century American actresses
Actresses from Detroit
Actresses from Minneapolis
American film actresses
American people of Jewish descent
American television actresses
American stage actresses
Living people
Actors from Turin
University of Michigan School of Music, Theatre & Dance alumni